The following lists relate to aviation:

General
 List of aircraft
 List of aircraft manufacturers
 List of aircraft by tail number
 List of aircraft engines
 List of aircraft engine manufacturers
 List of aerospace flight test centres
 List of test pilot schools
 List of airlines
 List of defunct airlines
 List of helicopter airlines
 List of airports
 List of aerobatic teams
 List of civil aviation authorities
 List of gliders
 Glider types
 List of aerospace museums
 Air Navigation and Transport Act
 Aircraft registration#List of countries/regions and their registration prefixes and patterns
 List of rotorcraft
 List of rotorcraft manufacturers by country
 List of Schneider Trophy aircraft

Military
 List of air forces
 List of experimental aircraft
 List of missiles
 List of unmanned aerial vehicles
 List of aircraft weapons
 Lists of military aircraft by nation

 Lists of Bulgarian military aircraft

Accidents and incidents
 List of accidents and incidents involving commercial aircraft
 List of accidents and incidents involving airliners by location
 List of fatalities from aviation accidents
 List of aircraft accidents and incidents resulting in at least 50 fatalities
 List of accidents and incidents involving general aviation
 Lists of accidents and incidents involving military aircraft

Records
 Flight airspeed record
 Flight altitude record
 Flight distance record
 Flight endurance record
 List of firsts in aviation
 List of large aircraft
 List of most-produced aircraft
 List of most-produced rotorcraft

References

External links